is a Japanese former competitive figure skater. He is a two-time Ondrej Nepela Memorial champion, the 2003 Winter Universiade bronze medalist, and a three-time Japan national medalist. He finished in the top ten at three Four Continents Championships.

Personal life

Kensuke Nakaniwa was born on October 15, 1981 in Fukuoka, Japan.

Career
In the 1999–2000 season, Nakaniwa won a bronze medal on the ISU Junior Grand Prix series and placed 13th at the 2000 World Junior Championships.

In the 2002–03 season, Nakaniwa made his Grand Prix debut and competed at his first senior ISU Championship, the 2003 Four Continents, where he finished 11th.

Nakaniwa ended his competitive career in 2011. He has coached Sei Kawahara.

Programs

Competitive highlights 
GP: Grand Prix; JGP: Junior Grand Prix

References

External links

 
 

1981 births
Living people
Japanese male single skaters
Sportspeople from Fukuoka (city)
Asian Games medalists in figure skating
Figure skaters at the 2007 Asian Winter Games
Medalists at the 2007 Asian Winter Games
Asian Games bronze medalists for Japan
Universiade medalists in figure skating
Universiade bronze medalists for Japan
Medalists at the 2003 Winter Universiade
Competitors at the 2001 Winter Universiade
Competitors at the 2005 Winter Universiade